The  is an art museum in Towada, Aomori Prefecture, Japan.

The museum was opened in 2008 as part of the Arts Towada Project, in an effort to revitalize the city. It features works from artists both inside and outside of Japan, including Yoko Ono, Yoshitomo Nara, and Jeong-Hwa Choi.

References

External links
 
 Official website 

Art museums established in 2008
2008 establishments in Japan
Towada, Aomori
Museums in Aomori Prefecture
Art museums and galleries in Aomori Prefecture